Nuno Miguel Pereira Reis  (born 31 January 1991) is a Portuguese professional footballer who plays mainly as a centre-back but also as a defensive midfielder for Australian club Melbourne City FC.

Formed at Sporting CP, where he was only a reserve, he spent most of his career abroad in Belgium, France, Greece, Bulgaria and Australia, winning two A-League Premierships and a Championship with Melbourne City.

Reis earned 75 caps and scored eight goals for Portugal across all youth levels, captaining the under-20 team to second place at the 2011 World Cup.

Club career

Sporting
Born in Murten, Switzerland to Portuguese immigrants, Reis was raised in Santa Catarina da Serra near Leiria, joining Sporting CP's youth ranks in 2003 at the age of 12 from Fátima-based Associação Desportiva Recreativa Cultural Vasco da Gama. During his formative years with the Lisbon club he won eight titles (including five national championships), going on to be part of the junior sides that conquered three consecutive leagues and being captain during the last year. In addition, he was called up for two first-team games, against C.F. Os Belenenses and Atlético Madrid (the latter in the UEFA Europa League).

After graduating from Sporting's academy, Reis was loaned out to Cercle Brugge K.S.V. in Belgium alongside teammate Renato Neto. In his first season in the Pro League he scored one goal in 32 appearances (all starts), helping the team to finish in ninth position.

On 29 January 2014, after one season with S.C. Olhanense – with which he made his Primeira Liga debut– and five months with Sporting B, Reis returned to Cercle Brugge, on loan for the remainder of the campaign.

Later career
Reis left Sporting on 27 June 2015, signing a two-year deal at FC Metz which was orchestrated by the former's director Carlos Freitas. He played 30 competitive matches as the campaign ended in promotion to Ligue 1, before he and compatriot André Santos were released.

On 5 July 2016, Reis penned a three-year contract at Panathinaikos F.C. of the Super League Greece, on the recommendation of their director Gilberto Silva. He left the club in January 2018 after making 37 appearances in all competitions, his only goal coming in a 4–0 win against Asteras Tripolis F.C. in the domestic cup.

Reis returned to his country of adoption on 28 January 2018, signing with Vitória F.C. until June 2020. On 5 September, however, he moved abroad again after agreeing to a three-year deal at PFC Levski Sofia.

On 18 January 2021, Reis signed with A-League's Melbourne City FC for three years. He played 20 games in his first season, ending with a 3–1 final win over Sydney FC on 27 June.

International career
Reis captained the Portugal under-20 side to the second place at the 2011 FIFA World Cup, playing all the matches and minutes in Colombia. He made his debut for the under-21s on 5 September 2011, coming on as a substitute for João Pereira in the 62nd minute of a 1–0 friendly victory over France.

Career statistics

Club

Honours
Melbourne City
A-League Premiership: 2020–21, 2021–22
A-League Championship: 2020–21

Portugal
FIFA U-20 World Cup runner-up: 2011

Orders
 Knight of the Order of Prince Henry

References

External links

Levski Sofia official profile

1991 births
Living people
People from Murten
Swiss people of Portuguese descent
Portuguese footballers
Association football defenders
Association football midfielders
Association football utility players
Primeira Liga players
Liga Portugal 2 players
Sporting CP B players
Sporting CP footballers
S.C. Olhanense players
Vitória F.C. players
Belgian Pro League players
Cercle Brugge K.S.V. players
Ligue 2 players
FC Metz players
Super League Greece players
Panathinaikos F.C. players
First Professional Football League (Bulgaria) players
PFC Levski Sofia players
A-League Men players
Melbourne City FC players
Portugal youth international footballers
Portugal under-21 international footballers
Portuguese expatriate footballers
Expatriate footballers in Belgium
Expatriate footballers in France
Expatriate footballers in Greece
Expatriate footballers in Bulgaria
Expatriate soccer players in Australia
Portuguese expatriate sportspeople in Belgium
Portuguese expatriate sportspeople in France
Portuguese expatriate sportspeople in Greece
Portuguese expatriate sportspeople in Bulgaria
Portuguese expatriate sportspeople in Australia